is a railway station on the Chūō Main Line, Central Japan Railway Company in the city of  Shiojiri, Nagano Prefecture, Japan.

Lines

Layout
The station has one ground-level side platform and one island platform connected by a footbridge. The station is unattended.

Platforms

Adjacent stations

History
Seba Station was opened on 1 December 1909.  On 1 April 1987, it became part of JR Tōkai.

Passenger statistics
In fiscal 2015, the station was used by an average of 56 passengers daily (boarding passengers only).

Surrounding area
Hiraide ruins (National Historic Site)
Seba-juku

See also
 List of Railway Stations in Japan

References

External links

Railway stations in Japan opened in 1909
Railway stations in Nagano Prefecture
Stations of Central Japan Railway Company
Chūō Main Line
Shiojiri, Nagano